Ellenbrook railway station is a proposed bus and railway station for the Transperth network. Construction began in January 2022, and is expected to open in 2024 as the terminus of the Morley–Ellenbrook railway line, serving the Perth suburb of Ellenbrook, Western Australia.

Station design
Ellenbrook station will feature a  island platform, half of which will be sheltered. There will be two car parks either side of the station, with a total of 500 car bays. A dedicated bus interchange with 12 bus stands will be constructed as well, providing feeder bus services to nearby suburbs. Other services to be provided at the station are toilets and a kiosk.

The station is deliberately going to be built slightly outside the railway alignment so that when the government wants to extend the railway line, a new station can be constructed at Ellenbrook whilst the old one is still in use. The station will be located on the edge of the Ellenbrook town centre.

History
A rail reserve through Ellenbrook has been in the Metropolitan Region Scheme since the suburb was created. Train services had always been part of the long term plan for Ellenbrook.

A railway station in Ellenbrook was first promised by both the Liberal and Labor parties prior to the 2008 state election. After the Liberal party won the election, they cancelled the plans for the railway station and line. The Labor party promised to build the Morley–Ellenbrook railway line prior to the 2013 state election and 2017 state election. After winning the 2017 state election, the Labor government got on with planning for the railway.

In September 2020, Laing O'Rourke was announced as the preferred proponent for the construction of the Morley–Ellenbrook railway line.

A groundbreaking ceremony occurred on 30 January 2022. The station will open by late 2024, and will serve a population of 70,000 by 2036.

Services
Ellenbrook station will be served by Transperth Trains operating along the Morley–Ellenbrook railway line to Perth railway station. It is projected that a journey to Perth will take 30 minutes, half of the current travel time by public transport. Ellenbrook station is in fare zone 3. Ellenbrook station is projected to have 8,016 passenger boardings per day in 2031.

References

External links
 Morley–Ellenbrook railway line Metronet page.
 

Ellenbrook, Western Australia
Morley–Ellenbrook line
Proposed railway stations in Perth, Western Australia